Makunduchi is a Tanzanian town, located the southeastern tip of Unguja (Zanzibar Island), south of Jambiani, in the South District of the Zanzibar Central/South Region.  The town comprises two distinct settlements, about 2 km from each other, "Old Makunduchi" and "New Makunduchi".  Old Makunduchi is a small fishermen's village, while New Makunduchi has some modern buildings, shops, as well as some blocks of flats that were built in the 1970s with the aid of East German funds and engineers.

Makunduchi is mostly known for the Mwaka Kogwa or Mwaka Koga ("show of the year") celebrations, of Shirazi heritage, that take place in July/August to celebrate the New Year. In Mwaka Kogwa, a ritual battle is fought, at the end of which a hut is burned. Then, predictions are made for the new year, based on the direction taken by the smoke. Tours are organised to visit the festival and to explain and point out the customs.

Tourism
Makunduchi is a protected area in Zanzibar. The first hotel was built in Makunduchi beach in 2006.

See also
Historic Swahili Settlements

Footnotes

Populated places in Zanzibar
Shirazi people
Swahili people
Swahili city-states
Swahili culture